Theobromine poisoning, also informally called chocolate poisoning or cocoa poisoning, is an overdosage reaction to the xanthine alkaloid theobromine, found in chocolate, tea, cola beverages, and some other foods.

Sources
Cocoa powder contains about  theobromine by weight, so  of raw cocoa contains approximately  theobromine.

Processed chocolate, in general, has smaller amounts. The amount found in highly refined chocolate candies or sweets (typically ) is much lower than that of dark chocolate or unsweetened baker's chocolate ( or ).

In species

Humans

Pharmacology

In general, the amount of theobromine found in chocolate is small enough that chocolate can be safely consumed by humans with a negligible risk of poisoning.

Toxicity
These are the mild-to-moderate symptoms. 

The severe symptoms are cardiac arrhythmias, epileptic seizures, internal bleeding, heart attacks, and eventually death.

In other species

Toxicity
Median lethal doses of theobromine have only been published for cats, dogs, rats, and mice; these differ by a factor of 6 across species.

Serious poisoning happens more frequently in domestic animals, which metabolize theobromine much more slowly than humans, and can easily consume enough chocolate to cause poisoning. The most common victims of theobromine poisoning are dogs, for whom it can be fatal. The toxic dose for cats is even lower than for dogs. However, cats are less prone to eating chocolate since they are unable to taste sweetness.

In dogs, the biological half-life of theobromine is 17.5 hours; in severe cases, clinical symptoms of theobromine poisoning can persist for 72 hours. Medical treatment performed by a veterinarian involves inducing vomiting within two hours of ingestion and administration of benzodiazepines or barbiturates for seizures, antiarrhythmics for heart arrhythmias, and fluid diuresis. For example,  of baker's chocolate would be enough to produce mild symptoms in a  dog, while a 25% cacao chocolate bar (like milk chocolate) would be only 25% as toxic as the same dose of baker's chocolate. One ounce of milk chocolate per pound of body weight is a potentially lethal dose in dogs.

Wildlife
In 2014, four American black bears were found dead at a bait site in New Hampshire. A necropsy and toxicology report performed at the University of New Hampshire in 2015 confirmed they died of heart failure caused by theobromine after they consumed  of chocolate and doughnuts placed at the site as bait. A similar incident killed a black bear cub in Michigan in 2011.

Pest control

In previous research, the USDA investigated the possible use of theobromine as a toxicant to control coyotes preying on livestock.

See also
 Xanthine oxidase

Footnotes

References
  (September 9, 2004)
 Merck Veterinary Manual (Toxicology/Food Hazards section), Merck & Co., Inc., Chocolate Poisoning.  (June 16, 2005)

External links

Toxicity basic facts

Cat health
Dog health
Poisoning by drugs, medicaments and biological substances
Veterinary toxicology